Pombalia Vand. is a genus of flowering plants belonging to the family Violaceae.

Its native range is the tropical and subtropical parts of Central and South America, Mexico and the American states of Arizona, Colorado, Kansas, New Mexico, Oklahoma and Texas. It has been introduced to Florida, Georgia, New Jersey, North Carolina (in the USA), KwaZulu-Natal (South Africa) and Vietnam (in Asia).
 
The genus name of Pombalia is in honour of Sebastião José de Carvalho e Melo, 1st Marquis of Pombal (1699–1782), a Portuguese statesman and diplomat who effectively ruled the Portuguese Empire from 1750 to 1777 as chief minister to King Joseph I. 
It was first described and published in Fasciculus Plantarum cum novis generibus et speciebus. Olisipone (Fasc. Pl.) on page 7 in 1771.

Known species
According to Kew;

References

Violaceae
Malpighiales genera
Plants described in 1771
Flora of Kansas
Flora of Oklahoma
Flora of Arizona
Flora of the South-Central United States
Flora of Mexico
Flora of South America